Midnight, Texas is an American supernatural drama television series broadcast on NBC. Midnight, Texas is based on the book series of the same name by author Charlaine Harris, who also wrote The Southern Vampire Mysteries, the novels which were adapted into the True Blood television series. The series premiered on July 24, 2017. On February 14, 2018, NBC renewed the series for a second season, which premiered on October 26, 2018.

On December 21, 2018, NBC canceled the series after two seasons, and the series finale aired on December 28, 2018. Producing studio Universal Television is shopping the series to other outlets.

Synopsis
On the run from his past, young psychic Manfred Bernardo is told by the ghost of his grandmother to seek out refuge in Midnight, Texas. There, he will find a community that can help him. Full of diverse characters—including a vampire, a witch, a fallen angel, a half-demon and a werecreature—Midnight faces numerous threats from the outside world as it welcomes the newcomer.

Cast and characters

Main

 François Arnaud as Manfred Bernardo, a psychic who moves to Midnight trying to outrun trouble that is following him.
 Arielle Kebbel as Olivia Charity, a freelance assassin with as many secrets as guns she owns, and wife of Lemuel.
 Peter Mensah as Lemuel "Lem" Bridger, a vampire with a dark past who first came to Midnight in the 1950s and never left, and Olivia's husband.
 Dylan Bruce as Bobo Winthrop, the human proprietor of Midnight Pawn, landlord to Lemuel, Olivia, and Manfred. Also, the best friend of Fiji, later her boyfriend.
 Parisa Fitz-Henley as Fiji Cavanaugh, a quirky free-spirited witch who owns Midnight's magic shop and struggles to come to terms with how powerful she really is.
 Jason Lewis as Joe Strong, a fallen angel who has prophesied darkness heading towards Midnight and husband of Chuy, who admonishes him for revealing his angelhood to others.
 Sarah Ramos as Creek Lovell (season 1; special guest, season 2), the mortal "girl next door beauty" waitress and gas-station attendant who becomes the love interest of Manfred, much to her father's distaste. Eventually, she reaches her limit with Midnight, and leaves town in "Head Games". She returns in "No More Mr. Nice Kai" but was later killed.
 Yul Vazquez as Reverend Emilio Sheehan (season 1; special guest, season 2), a quiet weretiger who presides over the Wedding Chapel and Pet Cemetery and their Midnighter patrons. He leaves Midnight in "To Witch Hell and Back" after Kai removes his weretiger curse.

Recurring
 Joanne Camp as Xylda, a former psychic and Manfred's grandmother and con-partner who now appears as a ghost to watch over him. She moves on after her tether to the world is broken.
 Kellee Stewart as Simone Davis/Madonna Reed, a fierce protector of her fellow Midnighters, and waitress and bartender at Midnight's Home Cookin' diner. It is revealed in season two she was operating under a fake name while spying on Olivia and she leaves town.
 Bernardo Saracino as Chuy Strong, a half-demon who, along with his husband, Joe, fears others will find out what they are. He is killed by Joe in season two.
 Bob Jesser as Shawn Lovell (season 1), the owner of Midnight's Gas 'N Go, who is an overly protective father to his children and distrusts Manfred.
 John-Paul Howard as Connor Lovell (season 1), the younger brother of Creek, who is as protective of her as she is of him. He harbors a secret of his own.
 Joe Smith as Mr. Snuggly (real name Jedediah), Fiji's talking familiar cat, who was previously the human lover of her aunt Mildred whom she turned into a cat to protect him.
 Nestor Carbonell as Kai Lucero (season 2), one of the owners of Midnight's new hotel, along with his wife Patience. Their sudden arrival in town causes a stir and has the Midnighters suspicious about what is really going on.
 Jaime Ray Newman as Patience Lucero (season 2), one of the owners of Midnight's new hotel, and Kai's wife.
 Josh Kelly as Walker Chisum (season 2), an openly gay demon hunter who has an intense connection with resident angel Joe Strong.

Episodes

Season 1 (2017)

Season 2 (2018)

Production

Development
In October 2015, it was reported that NBC was developing based on Charlaine Harris' best-selling series Midnight, Texas for the fall of 2016. Monica Owusu-Breenis will pilot and serve as an EP alongside David Janollari. In January 2016, it's announced that NBC ordered the pilot episode of the series, with Niels Arden Oplev aboard to direct the pilot and executive produce.

The series was commissioned on May 13, 2016 which will be composed of 13 episodes.

On February 14, 2018, it was announced that NBC renewed the series for a second season. Along with the announcement it was reported that the showrunner Monica Owusu-Breen will be replaced by Nicole Snyder and Eric Charmelo, who were consulting producers on Season 1.

Casting
At the end of June 2016, it was announced that Jason Lewis promoted to a series regular which had been written as a guest starring/recurring interpreting to Joe Strong. On January 11, 2017, it was announced that Bob Jesser has booked recurring role in the series as Shawn Lovell, Creek's protective father. On July 26, 2017, it was announced that Breeda Wool will appear in an episode playing Bowie, described as a "regal, formidable angel warrior".

Simultaneously with the announcement of the renewal, it was confirmed that Yul Vazquez and Sarah Ramos would not return as series regulars for the second season.

On July 21, 2018, three new recurring roles were announced. Nestor Carbonell and Jaime Ray Newman were cast as Kai and Patience Lucero, owners of the new Crystal Desert lodge, while Josh Kelly was booked as Walker Chisum, an openly gay demon hunter with an "intense connection" to Joe. Trace Lysette was cast in a guest role as "a dark witch bearing a shocker for the town's resident good witch."

Filming
The pilot was filmed in April 2016 in Albuquerque and Las Vegas, New Mexico. The rest of the production of the first season also took place in Santa Fe, Bernalillo and Belen, employing over 450 New Mexico crew members and approximately 1,800 New Mexico background talent, and wrapped up in February 2017. Most of the scenes were shot at night and once wrapped at 7 or 8 a.m., five times a week.

Marketing
The official trailer of the series was released on March 20, 2017.

Home media

DVD releases

Reception

Critical response
The review aggregation website Rotten Tomatoes reported a 61% approval rating for the first season, with an average rating of 5.34/10 based on 28 reviews. Metacritic, which uses a weighted average, assigned a first-season score of 50 out of 100, based on 16 reviews, indicating "mixed or average reviews".

Ratings

Season 1

Season 2

References

External links
 

2010s American drama television series
2010s American LGBT-related drama television series
2010s American supernatural television series
2017 American television series debuts
2018 American television series endings
Angels in television
Demons in television
English-language television shows
Television series about ghosts
NBC original programming
Television shows set in Texas
Serial drama television series
Vampires in television
Witchcraft in television
Television series by Universal Television
Television shows based on American novels
Fictional populated places in Texas
LGBT speculative fiction television series